Santa Fe Trail-Rice County Trail Segments are historic sites in Rice County, Kansas which preserve segments of the historic Santa Fe Trail.

An approximately  area including six of these sites, near Chase, known also as Ralph's Ruts, was listed on the National Register of Historic Places in 1995.

That area was expanded, adding two more sites, known as Kerns' Ruts, in 2013. These are all west of Chase.

Another location near Little River, Kansas, Santa Fe Trail-Rice County Segment 2, with reference number 13000580, was listed on the National Register on August 6, 2013. This added  and is located off Ave.

Less public information is available about another site listed on August 6, 2013, as Santa Fe Trail-Rice County Segment 3, with reference number 13000581, in the vicinity of Windom, Kansas.  It is address restricted.

References

Roads on the National Register of Historic Places in Kansas
Rice County, Kansas
Santa Fe Trail